Frederick Taylor (29 April 1916 – 18 June 1999) was an English cricketer active in the late 1930s, late 1940s and early 1950s. Born at Leek, Staffordshire, Taylor was a right-handed batsman and right-arm fast-medium bowler who made two appearances in first-class cricket, though was mostly associated with minor counties cricket.

Career 
Taylor made his debut in county cricket for Staffordshire in the 1937 Minor Counties Championship against Northumberland, making ten appearances in that season. He made three appearances for Staffordshire in 1938, before playing a first-class match for Warwickshire against Cambridge University, although he took three wickets in the match, this was to be his only appearance for the county. 

Following the end of the Second World War, Taylor resumed his minor counties career with Staffordshire, playing intermittently until 1951, making a total of 29 Minor Counties Championship appearances since 1937 and taking 124 wickets for the county, including 8 five wicket hauls in the minor counties championship. His best season came in 1946, when he took 37 wickets in his eight matches. Despite having not played minor counties cricket since 1951, Taylor was selected to play for a combined Minor Counties cricket team in 1953 against the touring Australians, taking a five wicket haul in the Australians' first-innings on a pitch which was described by Wisden as one which "left much to be desired for a game of such importance", and showed uneven bounce from Taylor's medium pace.

He died  at Stoke-on-Trent, Staffordshire on 18 June 1999. His father Charles Taylor also played first-class cricket.

References

External links
Frederick Taylor at ESPNcricinfo
Frederick Taylor at CricketArchive

1916 births
1999 deaths
Sportspeople from Leek, Staffordshire
English cricketers
Staffordshire cricketers
Warwickshire cricketers
Minor Counties cricketers